Arsura is a commune in Vaslui County, Western Moldavia, Romania. It is composed of four villages: Arsura, Fundătura, Mihail Kogălniceanu and Pâhnești.

Notable residents include Nicolae Lupu, doctor and member of the Romanian Academy. Mihail Kogălniceanu is commemorated in the modern name of one village.

References

Communes in Vaslui County
Localities in Western Moldavia